Rip Point is a point on Nelson Island forming the south side of the east entrance to Fildes Strait, in the South Shetland Islands. The name appears on a British Admiralty chart showing the results of a survey by DI personnel on the Discovery II in 1935.

References
 SCAR Composite Antarctic Gazetteer.

Headlands of Antarctica